Lawrence County is a county located in the U.S. state of Mississippi. As of the 2020 census, the population was 12,016. Its county seat is Monticello. The county is named for the naval hero James Lawrence.

Geography

Major highways
  U.S. Route 84
  Mississippi Highway 27
  Mississippi Highway 43
  Mississippi Highway 44

Adjacent counties
 Simpson County (northeast)
 Jefferson Davis County (east)
 Marion County (southeast)
 Walthall County (south)
 Lincoln County (west)
 Copiah County (northwest)

Demographics

2020 census

As of the 2020 United States census, there were 12,016 people, 4,849 households, and 3,385 families residing in the county.

2000 census
As of the census of 2000, there were 13,258 people, 5,040 households, and 3,749 families residing in the county.  The population density was 31 people per square mile (12/km2).  There were 5,688 housing units at an average density of 13 per square mile (5/km2).  The racial makeup of the county was 66.94% White, 32.07% Black or African American, 0.17% Native American, 0.27% Asian, 0.02% Pacific Islander, 0.09% from other races, and 0.44% from two or more races.  0.67% of the population were Hispanic or Latino of any race.

There were 5,040 households, out of which 35.40% had children under the age of 18 living with them, 55.90% were married couples living together, 14.40% had a female householder with no husband present, and 25.60% were non-families. 24.10% of all households were made up of individuals, and 11.40% had someone living alone who was 65 years of age or older.  The average household size was 2.61 and the average family size was 3.10.

In the county, the population was spread out, with 27.30% under the age of 18, 9.40% from 18 to 24, 27.50% from 25 to 44, 22.60% from 45 to 64, and 13.30% who were 65 years of age or older.  The median age was 36 years. For every 100 females there were 92.20 males.  For every 100 females age 18 and over, there were 88.30 males.

The median income for a household in the county was $28,495, and the median income for a family was $37,899. Males had a median income of $28,925 versus $18,707 for females. The per capita income for the county was $14,469.  About 16.60% of families and 19.60% of the population were below the poverty line, including 26.10% of those under age 18 and 19.50% of those age 65 or over.

Communities

Towns
 Monticello
 New Hebron
 Silver Creek

Unincorporated communities
 Arm
 Jayess
 Oak Vale (partly in Jefferson Davis County)
 Sontag
 Topeka

Education 
Public education is governed by the Lawrence County School District, which encompasses the entire county.

Notable people
 Earl W. Bascom (1906-1995), rodeo champion, cowboy artist, inventor, Mississippi Rodeo Hall of Fame inductee, "Father of Modern Rodeo" "Father of Mississippi Rodeo"
 Edgar Godbold (1872-1952), president of two Southern Baptist colleges, was a school principal in Lawrence County from 1905 to 1906.
 Rod Paige, Secretary of Education from 2001 to 2004 under President George W. Bush. Rod Paige was born and raised in Lawrence County.

Politics

See also
 National Register of Historic Places listings in Lawrence County, Mississippi

References

External links
 Lawrence County Courthouse Pictures
 Lawrence County Mississippi Genealogy and History

 
Mississippi counties
1814 establishments in Mississippi Territory
Populated places established in 1814